Dobravica pri Velikem Gabru (in older sources also Dobrovica) is a small settlement in the Municipality of Trebnje in eastern Slovenia. It lies southwest of Veliki Gaber, just south of the Slovenian A2 motorway. The area is part of the historical Lower Carniola region. The municipality is now included in the Southeast Slovenia Statistical Region.

Name
The name of the settlement was changed from Dobravica to Dobravica  pri Velikem Gabru in 1953.

References

External links
Dobravica pri Velikem Gabru at Geopedia

Populated places in the Municipality of Trebnje